Slade Deville Cutter (November 1, 1911 – June 9, 2005) was a career U.S. naval officer who was awarded four Navy Crosses and tied for second place for Japanese ships sunk in World War II.  He graduated from the United States Naval Academy as an All-American American football player.

Naval Academy and early naval career
Originally intending to become a professional flutist, Cutter instead went to Severn School, at the time a prep school for aspiring Naval Academy applicants, and was noticed in their athletic program. Not only a football star, he was an intercollegiate boxing champion."An all-American football player, he achieved instant fame as a first classman when he won the 1934 Army-Navy game with a first-quarter field goal.

On the basis of his Academy football career, he was later inducted into the College Football Hall of Fame. Cutter graduated in 1935, served on the battleship USS Idaho (BB-42), where he coached another winning football team."

Submarine duty
He entered Submarine School in June 1938. By the Attack on Pearl Harbor, he had advanced to executive officer.

First wartime assignment
Cutter was Executive Officer of  under LCDR Lew Parks when she left Pearl Harbor on her first war patrol on 18 December 1941, just 11 days after the Japanese attack. Only two days out of Pearl Harbor, Pompano was sighted by a U.S. patrol plane, which attacked, and called in dive bombers from the nearby . Three additional near-misses ruptured Pompanos fuel tanks and left her trailing an oil slick. Parks shook off his pursuers and pressed on to confirm the presence of Japanese troops on Wake Island. Pompano then continued to the Marshall Islands, where she found a 16,000-ton Japanese transport at Wotje, which was attacked with four torpedoes. Parks remained off Wotje for five more days and eventually attacked a destroyer, but his first two torpedoes detonated early.

After an inevitable depth-charge attack and with fuel draining relentlessly from the oil leak, Pompano returned to home base on 31 January 1942. Unfortunately, postwar analysis credited Parks with no more than possible damage to the Wotje transport.

Cutter made two more war patrols as Executive Officer of Pompano, operating in the vicinity of Okinawa and Honshū, respectively. The boat narrowly escaped destruction on 9 August 1942, when a Japanese depth charge unseated an engine exhaust valve, causing major flooding and driving her into the bottom near the Japanese coast. Fortunately, the crew managed to surface the boat and creep away.

USS Seahorse
Initially commanded by CDR Don McGregor, Seahorse took a shakedown cruise, and reached the Pacific in summer 1943.

Seahorses first war patrol began on 3 August 1943. After the boat returned, Vice Admiral Charles A. Lockwood (Commander, Submarines, Pacific Fleet, COMSUBPAC) relieved McGregor for not being aggressive enough. Cutter was named Commanding Officer of Seahorse in October 1943.

Cutter took his new charge out of Pearl Harbor on 20 October for her second war patrol and his first as Commanding Officer. Heading for the East China Sea, he drew first blood on the 29th, 30th, and 31st, when Seahorse sank three trawlers with gunfire south of Japan." Surprised by the sudden evidence of Triggers torpedoes, Cutter shot nine of his own and sank two freighters. Entering the East China Sea and bearing for the Korea Strait, Cutter sank two more ships, then returned to Pearl Harbor on 12 December. For this patrol, he claimed four ships (totalling 19,570 tons) sunk, not counting the trawlers. The patrol earned him his first Navy Cross.

His next patrol left Pearl Harbor on 6 January 1944, headed for a patrol area near the Palau Islands, near the Philippines. En route, he sank an escorted freighter. Arriving in the patrol area, he received a message from HYPO, alerting him to a convoy of two freighters and three escorts, which he located visually on 21 January. He sank both freighters. 

Seahorse then moved to Palau and on 28 January, Cutter discovered three freighters emerging from the harbor under heavy escort. He tracked the convoy for 32 hours waiting for an opening and at 0200 on the 30th was finally able to put three torpedoes into Toku Maru (2,747 tons). One of these blew the stern off, and she went down directly, taking over 450 troops with her. Harassed by the escorts and accompanying aircraft, Cutter nonetheless kept Seahorse in trail of the remaining Japanese for another 48 hours and attempted another attack just after midnight on 1 February. Eight torpedoes missed. Under heavy pressure from an escort, he shot two last torpedoes from his stern tubes just before going deep. Amid the ensuing depth charge attack, Cutter's men heard both torpedoes hit and the now-familiar sound of exploding gasoline drums. Indeed, it was later confirmed that they had sunk the Japanese steamer Toei Maru (4,004 tons). After this 80-hour chase – nearly a record, Seahorse returned to Pearl Harbor on 16 February with another five ships and 13,716 tons to her credit. The patrol earned Cutter a second Navy Cross.

Seahorses fourth war patrol took her to the Mariana Islands, specifically to prevent the Japanese from reinforcing Guam and Saipan. She departed Pearl Harbor on 16 March 1944, and near Guam on 8 April came across a Japanese supply convoy, damaging two vessels that subsequently sank. Seahorse moved on, and the very next day found a 15-20 ship convoy that had already been attacked by  Trigger as it neared Saipan, sinking another cargo ship.

On lifeguard (aircrew rescue) duty in support of carrier air strikes on Saipan, Seahorse next sighted and sank the Japanese submarine I-174, one of the few submarine attacks on another submarine in World War Two. A week later, Seahorse found another convoy 45 miles west of Saipan and sank another freighter, refueling in New Guinea returning to Brisbane, Australia, on the 11th. The patrol earned Cutter a third Navy Cross.

Accompanying the U.S. invasion of the Marianas in mid-June 1944, Lockwood sent more than a dozen submarines westward to interdict possible Japanese reinforcements. Seahorse greatest contribution to the Battle of the Philippine Sea was locating a Japanese battle group centered around the Japanese battleships Yamato and Musashi. In 1997, Cutter told a reporter the task force was too distant to catch, but he sent a routine contact report.

After the battle, Seahorse joined a wolfpack in the Luzon Strait, and sank five more ships. Cutter was awarded a fourth Navy Cross for the patrol.

Assigned to new construction
After Seahorses fourth patrol and a rest leave, Cutter was assigned as Commanding Officer of the new-construction . His wife, Fran, sponsored the ship when she commissioned on 28 April 1945. Requin left Portsmouth for the Pacific theater in early June and arrived at Pearl Harbor at the end of July, but the war ended shortly after she departed on her first war patrol.

World War II summary

 

 

Command style
His biographer, Carl Lavo, described Cutter as having an abrasive style with superior officers, which may well have cost him selection for promotion to rear admiral. Especially controversial was his effective challenge to Adm. Hyman Rickover, claiming the first nuclear submarine, was "strictly a test vehicle. I doubt if she will ever fire a shot in anger."

Postwar naval service
Postwar, Cutter attained the rank of captain and subsequently commanded the oiler  and the heavy cruiser  while she was flagship of the United States Second Fleet.

Cutter was named athletic director at the Naval Academy in the late 1950s, in an effort to encourage popular football coach Eddie Erdelatz to resign. Lavo said Erdelatz was running a "professional-style football program" but too few players were opting to remain in the Navy after graduation because of his reputed disparaging of the service. Capt. Cutter's knowledge of the sports program and his feeling Erdelatz was "disloyal to the Navy" led to Erdelatz's departure. Much of the task was helped by Capt. Cutter's stature as an athletic and wartime hero." His final active-duty assignment, in 1965, was as head of the Naval Historical Display Center in Washington.

Retirement and death
Cutter retired from active duty in 1965 and was elected to the College Football Hall of Fame in 1967. He later became headmaster of a boys' school in Tucson, where he moved to care for his first wife's asthma condition. Frances Leffler Cutter died in 1981.  After her death, he moved back to Annapolis. In 1982, he married Ruth McCracken Buek.

Cutter died June 9, 2005, at Ginger Cove retirement community in Annapolis at age 93. He had Parkinson's disease. Survivors include his wife of 23 years, Ruth McCracken Buek Cutter of Annapolis; two children from the first marriage, Slade D. Cutter Jr. of Austin and Anne McCarthy of Santa Fe, N.M.; three stepchildren, Scott Buek of Delran, N.J., Harvey Buek of Conshohocken, Pa., and Pamela Sullivan of Sparks, Nev.; a sister; nine grandchildren; and five great-grandchildren, including Mackenzie Williams, a Jefferson Scholar at the University of Virginia.

Memorials
A 40-acre athletic field in Hampton Roads, Virginia was dedicated as the Captain Slade Cutter Athletic Park'' on 14 October 2011. Ruth Cutter (widow) was in attendance to hear the dedication remarks:  "They say the name makes a man—and what a name. Slade Cutter—he was destined for greatness."

Awards and decorations

Notes

References

Attribution

External links

 
 Interview with Slade D. Cutter, July 02, 1984. University of Texas at San Antonio: Institute of Texan Cultures: Oral History Collection, UA 15.01, University of Texas at San Antonio Libraries Special Collections.

1911 births
2005 deaths
Navy Midshipmen athletic directors
Navy Midshipmen football players
College Football Hall of Fame inductees
People from Oswego, Illinois
United States Navy personnel of World War II
United States Naval Academy alumni
United States submarine commanders
Recipients of the Navy Cross (United States)
Recipients of the Silver Star
American football tackles
Military personnel from Illinois